Alf's Button may refer to:

Alf's Button (novel), a 1920 novel by W.A. Darlington
Alf's Button (play), a 1924 play based on the novel
Alf's Button (1920 film), a 1920 silent film adaptation
Alf's Button (1930 film), a 1930 sound film adaptation
Alf's Button Afloat, a 1938 comedy film